The Three Bears are animated cartoon characters in the Warner Bros. Looney Tunes and Merrie Melodies series of cartoons. The dysfunctional family consists of Papa Bear (sometimes called Henry), Mama Bear, and Junior Bear (sometimes spelled Junyer or Joonyer). The characters were featured in five theatrical cartoons released between 1944 and 1951.

Characters
Henry Bear (better known as Papa Bear) is the father of Junior Bear and the husband of Mama Bear. Papa Bear is a loud-mouthed, short-tempered, psycholic and abusive dwarf bear. He usually abuses Junior if he says or does something wrong. He is never abusive with Mama Bear (except for near the end of What's Brewin', Bruin?) but would sometimes act rude to her, such as telling her to "shut up" (especially when she's trying to tell him something important). While Papa and Junior are the two who are constantly at each other's hair, usually Junior is at the receiving end of Papa's wrath, while Mama Bear always ended up in the middle.
Mama Bear is the mother of Junior Bear and the wife of Papa Bear. Mama Bear is an innocent, long-suffering, polite, considerate and deadpan middle-bear, although she never seems to stop or reprimand Henry for his abuse towards Junior. When she tries to tell Henry something important, he usually tells her to "shut up" and refuses to listen. While she does not seem to show it, she has a great deal of affection for her husband and son; however, when Bugs Bunny flirts with her in order to distract her from pummelling him and gives her a kiss on the lips, she takes it a bit too seriously and gains a crush on him. Mama Bear attempts to seduce him and inevitably leaves his face covered with lipstick marks, much to his dismay.
Junior Bear (sometimes spelled Junyer or Joonyer) is the child of Henry Bear and Mama Bear. Junior Bear is an oversized, overweight, unintelligent, bumbling and clumsy bear. He is 7-years-old, yet he is twice as tall as his parents, and has a heavy voice. He is very dim-witted, naïve, and childish, but has a good heart and is always in a good mood. He idolizes his father Henry, who is often abusive toward him. He appears to be an adult because of his size, but is still a child. Junior still wears diapers even though he is 7-years-old.

Appearance

First theatrical film
Animator Chuck Jones introduced the trio in the 1944 cartoon Bugs Bunny and the Three Bears, in which Bugs Bunny invades the home of the three bears, and Mama Bear takes a fancy to him. In the short, Papa Bear tries to feed his starving family by having them act out their roles in the traditional fairy tale from which they derive their name. Unfortunately for them, when they were out of porridge, Mama substitutes carrot soup for it, and the "Goldilocks" they lure turns out to be Bugs. Purcell and Liepien, in Parallel Curriculum Units for Social Studies, Grades 6-12, recommended this film as part of the study of the sociological implications of humor; Steven Case, in Toons That Teach, also mines this work for pedagogic value.

Further theatrical appearances
Jones brought back the Bears for his 1948 cartoon What's Brewin', Bruin?, this time without Bugs. Here, Papa Bear decides that it is time for the Bears to hibernate; however, various disturbances interfere. Junior's voice is here supplied by Stan Freberg.

Other Three Bears cartoons included Bee-Deviled Bruin and ''Bear Feat, both released in 1949. The final Three Bears cartoon of the classic era, A Bear for Punishment (1951), parodies cultural values surrounding the celebration of Father's Day.

Film appearances
The entire Bear Family appears in Looney Tunes: Back in Action movie as tourists from Paris (Papa Bear is voiced by Will Ryan, Mama Bear by Joe Alaskey and Stan Freberg returns as the voice of Junior Bear).

The Three Bears make a cameo appearance in Bah, Humduck! A Looney Tunes Christmas as Daffy's employees.

The Three Bears make a cameo appearance in Space Jam: A New Legacy in Bugs Bunny's flashback alongside other Looney Tunes leaving Tune World.

Television appearances
Ma Bear has a cameo appearance in Season 1 of the Tiny Toon Adventures episode "Prom-ise Her Anything", released in 1990, in which she appears as at the ACME Looniversity junior prom as a canteen cook providing refreshments.

The entire Bear Family appeared in "Teddy Bears' Picnic" (Papa Bear voiced by Frank Welker, Mama Bear voiced by Tress MacNeille, and Junior Bear voiced by Stan Freberg), where Elmyra followed them to an all-bear picnic. The running gag was that Papa Bear got injured by either an angry strong father bear, who he or Junior Bear, angered, or by Junior Bear, and when he attempted to hit Junior Bear on the head, Mama Bear would hit him on the head with the newspaper, except when he hit himself on the head with it.

The entire Bear Family appears in a painting in the bedroom in the Animaniacs episode "Nighty-Night Toon".

Papa Bear (listed in the credits as Vern) appears in the Animaniacs episode "Garage Sale of the Century" (voiced by Ed Asner) as a bachelor, where he has a garage sale, swindling his customers out of their money, and refusing to give refunds, but the Warners took the expression too literally and wanted to buy his garage. Papa Bear refused to sell his garage, and after the Warners attempted to bargain with him and auction off his garage, he saw through their ruse, but his customers demanded refunds. Papa Bear attempted to lie about donating all of his "profits" to charity, but Wakko used his garage door opener (which he repaired after accidentally breaking it earlier) to expose his money, and his customers (including Batman, Buster Bunny, Babs Bunny, Dizzy Devil), and especially an old woman who he rudely refused her a refund (a penny) and threw into a tree earlier in the episode, got their refunds by force, leaving Papa Bear broke, and so he caved in and sold his garage to the Warners for 26¢ (even though the actual value was $20,000) as it was attached to his house.

The Three Bears appear in The Looney Tunes Show episode "Ridiculous Journey" from its second season (Papa Bear voiced by Maurice LaMarche, Mama Bear voiced by Grey Delisle and Junior Bear voiced by John DiMaggio).

The Three Bears also made a cameo appearance in the Looney Tunes Cartoons episode "Happy Birthday, Bugs Bunny".

See also

Baby Huey
Barney Bear

References

External links 

 All about The Three Bears on Chuck Jones Official Website.

Anthropomorphic bears
Fictional trios
Film characters introduced in 1944
Looney Tunes characters